Citronen Fjord is a fjord in Peary Land, far northern Greenland. Administratively it is part of the Northeast Greenland National Park.

The name of the fjord was given by Danish Arctic explorer Eigil Knuth during the Danish Peary Land Expedition of 1947–1950. It was named after Danish freedom fighters.

History
In 1993 zinc and lead deposits were discovered in this fjord. They are considered to be the largest yet unexploited zinc deposits in the world and the exploitation of the Citronen mine is in the preparation phase. Australian Ironbark Zinc corporation and the People's Republic of China are involved in the mine projects of the Citronen Fjord.

Geography
Citronen Fjord is an offshoot on the southern shore of Frederick E. Hyde Fjord. It is located in Hans Egede Land,  from Cape John Flagler, at the fjord entrance. The fjord is roughly oriented in a north–south direction. It is only  in length and there is no glacier discharging at the head of the fjord.

See also
List of fjords of Greenland

References

External links
The Citronen Fjord massive sulphide deposit, Peary Land, North Greenland: discovery, stratigraphy, mineralization and structural setting
Ironbark set to open a new zinc basin for hungry smelters

Frederick E. Hyde Fjord